Commersonia bartramia, commonly known as brown kurrajong, is a species of flowering plant in the family Malvaceae and is native to Southeast Asia, the Northern Territory, Queensland and New South Wales. It is a tree or shrub with heart-shaped to egg-shaped leaves much paler on the lower surface, and sometimes with fine, irregular teeth on the edges.

Description
The tip of the leaf tapers to a fine point, there are sometimes fine, irregular teeth on the lower surface, and the lower surface is much paler than the upper surface.

Taxonomy
Brown kurrajong was first formally described in 1759 by Carl Linnaeus who gave it the name Muntingia bartramia in Amoenitates Academicae. In 1917, Elmer Drew Merrill changed the name to Commersonia bartramia in his book, An Interpretation of Rumphius's Herbarium Amboinense.

The specific epithet (bartramia) honours the American botanist, John Bartram.

Distribution and habitat
Commersonia bartramia grows in rainforest, and along creeks and gullies near the edges of rainforest. It is a common species in regrowth areas of rainforest and occurs from southern China to as far south as the Bellinger River in New South Wales.

References

bartramia
Flora of the Northern Territory
Flora of New South Wales
Flora of Queensland
Taxa named by Carl Linnaeus
Plants described in 1917